The Ramsey County Sheriff's Office was designed by Haxby & Gillespie and was built in 1909 by the Dinnie Brothers.  Also known as Lake Region Heritage Center, it was listed on the National Register of Historic Places in 1978.

It is "a well-preserved example of Georgian Revival architecture" and is deemed significant "for its original long-term use as the official residence of the sheriffs of Ramsey County."  From 1974 on it served as a cultural center.

References

Houses on the National Register of Historic Places in North Dakota
Colonial Revival architecture in North Dakota
Georgian Revival architecture in North Dakota
Houses completed in 1911
Houses in Ramsey County, North Dakota
National Register of Historic Places in Ramsey County, North Dakota
1911 establishments in North Dakota
Law enforcement in North Dakota